Maureen Deidre Freely FRSL (born July 1952) is an American journalist, novelist, professor, and translator. She has worked on the Warwick Writing Programme since 1996.

Biography
Born in Neptune, New Jersey, she is the daughter of author John Freely, and has a brother, Brendan.
Maureen Freely grew up in Turkey. She graduated from Harvard College. She now lives in England.

She is the mother of four children and two step-children. She was married to Paul Spike, with whom she had a son and a daughter.

Freely is an atheist.

Work
Freely lectures at the University of Warwick and is an occasional contributor to The Guardian and The Independent newspapers. From 2014 to 2018 she served as president of English PEN, the founding centre of PEN International.

Among her novels is The Life of the Party, set in Turkey. She has also written The Other Rebecca, a contemporary version of Daphne du Maurier's classic 1938 novel Rebecca. Freely is also an occasional contributor to Cornucopia, a magazine about Turkey.

She is best known as the Turkish-into-English translator of Orhan Pamuk's recent novels. She works closely with Pamuk on these translations, because they often serve as the basis when his work is translated into other languages. They were both educated simultaneously at Robert College in Istanbul, although they did not know each other at the time. Marie Arana praised Freely's translations of Pamuk works like Snow, Istanbul: Memories and the City, and The Museum of Innocence as "vibrant and nimble" translations.

Freely translated and wrote an introduction to Fethiye Çetin's memoir, My Grandmother.

Freely was elected a Fellow of the Royal Society of Literature in 2012.

Bibliography

Novels 
 Sailing Through Byzantium (2013)
 Enlightenment (2008)
 The Other Rebecca (2000)
 Mother's Helper (1982)
 The Stork Club (1995)
 What About Us (1996)
 The Parent Trap (2002)
 Under the Vulcania (1994)
 The Life of the Party (1986)

Translations 
of Orhan Pamuk:
 The Black Book
 Snow
 Other Colors: Essays and a story
 Istanbul: Memories and the City
 The Museum of Innocence

of Fethiye Çetin:
 My Grandmother

of Sabahattin Ali:
 Madonna in a Fur Coat (with Alexander Dawe)
of Ahmet Hamdi Tanpınar:
 The Time Regulation Institute 
of Sait Faik Abasıyanık:
 A Useless Man

References 

1952 births
Living people
20th-century American novelists
20th-century American translators
20th-century American women writers
20th-century English people
20th-century English women
21st-century American novelists
21st-century American translators
21st-century American women writers
21st-century English people
21st-century English women
Academics of the University of Warwick
American atheists
American emigrants to England
American expatriates in Turkey
American women academics
American women novelists
English atheists
English women novelists
Fellows of the Royal Society of Literature
Harvard College alumni
Literary translators
People from Neptune Township, New Jersey
Presidents of the English Centre of PEN
Turkish–English translators